Aleksei or Alexey Mikhaylov may refer to: 
 Aleksei Mikhaylov (footballer), Russian footballer
 Alexey Mikhaylov (officer), Red Army colonel